The following is a list of episodes for the 1999–2002 television series, Relic Hunter. Three seasons consisting of 22 episodes each were broadcast between September 20, 1999, and May 20, 2002. In total 66 episodes were produced.

The series ran in the US as well as both Ireland and the United Kingdom, where it has aired on Sky1 and subsidiary channels, while in Canada, it has aired on Citytv, Space, Showcase, and recently CTV's sister network A-Channel before it was outright bought out by them.

All three seasons have been released on DVD in Region 1 and in Region 4.

Season 1 was released in Region 2 in a digitally restored version on 28 December 2015.

Series overview

Episodes

Season 1 (1999–2000)

Season 2 (2000–01)

Season 3 (2001–02)

External links
 

Lists of Canadian television series episodes